Elk Falls is a city in Elk County, Kansas, United States, along the Elk River.  As of the 2020 census, the population of the city was 113.

History
The first European-American house was built at Elk Falls in 1870, and a post office was opened that same year. Elk Falls was named for a waterfall on the Elk River, near where the town developed. Two early settlers in the rural community were the widow Prudence Crandall (who took back her maiden name after her husband died), an educator from Connecticut who had established the Canterbury Female Boarding School in the 1830s for African-American girls and young women; and her brother Hezekiah. They both died here and were buried in the town cemetery.

Geography
Elk Falls is located at  (37.371950, -96.190115).

Demographics

2010 census
As of the census of 2010, there were 107 people, 54 households, and 33 families residing in the city. The racial makeup of the city was 92.5% White, 1.9% Native American, 0.9% Asian, and 4.7% from two or more races. Hispanic or Latino of any race were 0.9% of the population.

There were 54 households, of which 16.7% had children under the age of 18 living with them, 50.0% were married couples living together, 9.3% had a female householder with no husband present, 1.9% had a male householder with no wife present, and 38.9% were non-families. 35.2% of all households were made up of individuals, and 22.2% had someone living alone who was 65 years of age or older. The average household size was 1.98 and the average family size was 2.52.

The median age in the city was 52.9 years. 16.8% of residents were under the age of 18; 2.9% were between the ages of 18 and 24; 9.3% were from 25 to 44; 42.9% were from 45 to 64; and 28% were 65 years of age or older. The gender makeup of the city was 45.8% male and 54.2% female.

2000 census
As of the census of 2000, there were 112 people, 51 households, and 32 families residing in the city. The racial makeup of the city was 92.86% White, 0.89% Native American, 0.89% Asian, 0.89% from other races, and 4.46% from two or more races. Hispanic or Latino of any race were 3.57% of the population.

There were 51 households, out of which 23.5% had children under the age of 18 living with them, 58.8% were married couples living together, 2.0% had a female householder with no husband present, and 35.3% were non-families. 27.5% of all households were made up of individuals, and 11.8% had someone living alone who was 65 years of age or older. The average household size was 2.20 and the average family size was 2.70.

In the city, the population was spread out, with 19.6% under the age of 18, 4.5% from 18 to 24, 18.8% from 25 to 44, 37.5% from 45 to 64, and 19.6% who were 65 years of age or older. The median age was 48 years. For every 100 females, there were 107.4 males. For every 100 females age 18 and over, there were 104.5 males.

The median income for a household in the city was $20,893, and the median income for a family was $32,500. Males had a median income of $29,375 versus $20,250 for females. The per capita income for the city was $15,817. There were 6.7% of families and 2.9% of the population living below the poverty line, including no under eighteens and none of those over 64.

Education
The community is served by West Elk USD 282 public school district.  West Elk High School is located in Howard. The West Elk High School mascot is Patriots.

References

Further reading

External links
 Elk Falls - Directory of Public Officials
 Elk Falls city map, KDOT

Cities in Kansas
Cities in Elk County, Kansas